In enzymology, a UDP-N-acetylmuramoyl-L-alanine—D-glutamate ligase is an enzyme that catalyzes the chemical reaction

ATP + UDP-N-acetylmuramoyl-L-alanine + D-glutamate  ADP + phosphate + UDP-N-acetylmuramoyl-L-alanyl-D-glutamate

The 3 substrates of this enzyme are ATP, UDP-N-acetylmuramoyl-L-alanine, and D-glutamate, whereas its 3 products are ADP, phosphate, and UDP-N-acetylmuramoyl-L-alanyl-D-glutamate.

This enzyme belongs to the family of ligases, specifically those forming carbon-nitrogen bonds as acid-D-amino-acid ligases (peptide synthases).  The systematic name of this enzyme class is UDP-N-acetylmuramoyl-L-alanine:D-glutamate ligase (ADP-forming). Other names in common use include MurD synthetase, UDP-N-acetylmuramoyl-L-alanyl-D-glutamate synthetase, uridine diphospho-N-acetylmuramoylalanyl-D-glutamate synthetase, D-glutamate-adding enzyme, D-glutamate ligase, UDP-Mur-NAC-L-Ala:D-Glu ligase, UDP-N-acetylmuramoyl-L-alanine:glutamate ligase (ADP-forming), and UDP-N-acetylmuramoylalanine-D-glutamate ligase.  This enzyme participates in d-glutamine and d-glutamate metabolism and peptidoglycan biosynthesis.

Structural studies

References 

 
 

EC 6.3.2
Enzymes of known structure